Lapor Polisi (English: Report the Police) is a criminal news program that aired on iNews in Indonesia. This criminal news program was launched on April 4, 2022, and broadcasts daily.

See also 

 Sergap
 Realita

References 

Indonesian television news shows
Indonesian-language television shows
2022 Indonesian television series debuts
2020s Indonesian television series
INews original programming